Ustyanka is a rural locality (a selo) and the administrative center of Ustyansky Selsoviet, Burlinsky District, Altai Krai, Russia. The population was 982 as of 2013. It was founded in 1891. There are 4 streets.

Geography 
Ustyanka is located near the Burla river, 40 km northeast of Burla (the district's administrative centre) by road. Lesnoye is the nearest rural locality.

References 

Rural localities in Burlinsky District